Gozalena was a town of ancient Pontus, inhabited during Roman times. 

Its site is tentatively located near Ezinepazar in Asiatic Turkey.

References

Populated places in ancient Pontus
Former populated places in Turkey
Roman towns and cities in Turkey
History of Tokat Province